Joan Ridder Challinor is the former chairperson of the National Commission on Libraries and Information Science in the United States. She was appointed to the commission by President Bill Clinton in 1995. She served as vice chairperson of the commission from 2000 to 2003. She was designated as its chairperson on July 20, 2003, and served until January 28, 2004.

She was succeeded as Chairperson by Beth Dustan Fitzsimmons.

Background
Challinor serves as the Chairperson of the Advisory Committee of the Arthur and Elizabeth Schlesinger Library on the History of Women in America at Radcliffe College. She is a member of the Madison Council at the Library of Congress. She is a founding member of the Louis Round Wilson Academy. She is a director of media conglomerate Knight-Ridder.

Publications
 Joan R. Challinor, Louisa Catherine Johnson Adams: The Price of Ambition (Ph.D. dissertation, American University, 1982), 178 pages.
 Joan R. Challinor and Robert L. Beisner, editors, Arms at Rest: Peacemaking and Peacekeeping in American history (NY: Greenwood Press, 1987)
 Allan J. Lichtman and Joan R. Challinor, editors, Kin and Communities: Families in America (Washington: Smithsonian Institution Press, 1979)

References

 US National Commission on Libraries and Information Science, Meeting the Information Needs of the American People: Past Actions and Future Initiatives (Washington, DC: US Government Printing Office, March 2008), pages B-6 and D-3 
 The Louis Round Wilson Academy formed; Creating trust in the digital age (Press Release, University of North Carolina, Chapel Hill, School of Information and Library Science, November 2005)

External links
Papers of Joan R. Challinor, 1975-2008, Radcliffe Institute, Harvard University

Year of birth missing (living people)
Living people
American civil servants